Cleveland is a township of about 1,600 people in Le Val-Saint-François Regional County Municipality in the Estrie region of Quebec, Canada.

It was named after George Nelson Cleveland, the first mayor.

Demographics 

Mother tongue (2011)

See also
List of township municipalities in Quebec

References

External links

Township municipalities in Quebec
Incorporated places in Estrie